The 2011–12 season is the 1st inaugural season of the SEHA League and 12 teams from Bosnia and Herzegovina, Croatia, Serbia, Montenegro, Macedonia and Slovakia participate in it.

Team information

Venues and locations

RK Partizan (Serbian league, 1st) and RK Mojkovac (Montenegrin league, 1st) declined participation.

Regular season

Standings

Results
In the table below the home teams are listed on the left and the away teams along the top.

1played in Skopje
2played in Zagreb

Final four

Semifinals

Match for third place

Final

References

SEHA Bulletin No. 23
SEHA Bulletin No. 24

External links
Official website

SEHA League
2011–12 domestic handball leagues